Bhāva (Sanskrit: , 'state, condition') is a term in Jyotisha denoting a fixed zodiacal division of the sky from the perspective of an observer.  It corresponds to the concept of "house" in Western astrology.  A natal chart is called bhāvachakra (Sanskrit: , 'wheel'.)

Overview
In almost all traditional practice, the twelve houses (bhāva) of a chart have the same boundaries as the twelve signs in the chart; in other words, each sign is a house in the chart.  The beginning of each house is the 0th degrees of the sign and the end is the 30th degree of the sign.  What varies from chart to chart is the enumeration of these houses, i.e., which sign is the first house, which is the second, and so forth.  This is determined by the position of the Lagna (the Ascendant, or the longitudinal point of the zodiac that was rising in the East at birth.)  The house in which the Lagna falls is usually the first house of the chart, and the other houses follow it, counter-clockwise, in the sequence of the zodiac.  It is possible, however, for the houses to be defined relative to some other factor, such as a planet, a sign, or any other factor.

Each of the twelve houses signifies a region of the concerns of life, and the identity of the sign of that house colors what may be expected from that life.

More than one system to align houses with signs are recognized in Jyotisha. The most common method is described above, a method that Western astrologers call the whole sign house system; another is Sripathi, introduced by Sripati, akin to a Porphyry house system. The modern Krishnamurti Paddhati also incorporates a Placidus house system.

The principle of House Division introduced in Sripathi Bhāva System is described as follows: "In  the  Sripathi  system the 1st house cusp is the Lagna, and the 7th house  cusp  is  the Descendant opposite it, the 10th house cusp is at the  MC (Medium Coeli or Madhya Lagna), i.e. Nadir. The four quarters divided thus should be divided into three equal parts each, and thus we find the 12 house cusps in Sripathi system. To find the Bhava Sandhis (meeting points of houses) we should divide the distance between the house cusps into halves."

The houses
The names of the 12 houses and the areas of life represented by them are:
 Lagna - Nature of Native, Appearance, Health, Character, Purpose of Life, behavior, birth, limbs,  head
 Dhana - Wealth, Family, Domestic Comforts, Early Education, Inheritance, Speech, moveable assets
 Parakrama - Younger Brothers and Sisters, Communication (Talking, Writing, Business Documents), Intelligence, fine arts Short Journeys, "great prowess (physical and mental),"  hands, arms, shoulders 
 Suhṛda - Mother, Emotions, Education, Home, Property and Land, Surrounding in Old Age, vehicles, the chest
 Suta - Children, Lovers, Recreation Devotion, Speculation and Gambling,  the belly, accumulated karma
 Ripu/Roga - Diseases, Maternal uncle and aunt, Litigation, Servants, Mental Worries, Enemies, Foreigners, small intestine,
 Kāma - Spouse, Business Partner, Death, Respect, passion, groin 
 Mṛtyu - Death & Longevity, Obstacles, Suffering, Sexual organs and sexual attractiveness, Occult, Dowry, Inheritance, Imprisonment, Excretory organs, accidents
 Bhāgya - Father, Luck, Higher learning, Philosophy & Religion, Mentor or Guru,  Prosperity, Travel, "deeds of virtue"
 Karma  - Profession, Status & fame, Power, Father, Mother-in-law, Government, Clothes, Commerce, knees
 Āya - Friends, Hopes, Earnings, Club or Social Activities, Elder Brothers and Sisters, Daughter/Son-in-law, calves, shins and ankles
 Vyaya - Expenses, Sleep (and convalescence), Sexual pleasures, Spirituality, Travel & Pilgrimage, Secret Enemies, Imprisonment, Hospitals, Asylums, Liberation, loss foreign residency, feet

Classifications
In general, houses are classified into four categories:
Kendra: the angular houses, that is the first, fourth, seventh and tenth houses.  (kendra, from Greek κἐντρα, also describes the relationship between any houses or grahas which are about 90 degrees apart.)  These are very strong houses for grahas to occupy.
Trikona: the houses forming a triangle within the chart with the first house, about 120 degrees apart from one another, that is the first, fifth and ninth.  These are the most auspicious houses. (From Greek τρἰγωνα.)
Dusthāna: the less fortunate houses which tend to rule unhappy areas.  These houses make no clear geometric connection to the Lagna.  Dusthanas include the sixth, eighth and twelfth houses.
Upachaya: "growth" or "remedial" houses, where malefic planets tend to improve, include the third, sixth, tenth and eleventh houses.

Succedent houses are called pāṇaphara (from Greek ἐπαναφοραἱ), and cadent houses are called āpoklima (Gk. ἀποκλἰματα).

In Indian Vedic astrology, also, the twelve houses are called Bhava and have meanings very similar to their Western counterparts. The houses are divided into four 'bhavas' which point to 'mood' or what the house stands for. These four bhavas are Dharma (duty), Artha (resources), Kama (desires) and Moksha (liberation). These bhavas are called 'purusharthas or 'aims in life.' The ancient mystics of India realized that the austere path of the yogi was not for everyone. They found that each human existence has four worthwhile goals in life:

 Dharma – 1st, 5th and 9th Bhavas/Houses – The need to find our path and purpose. 
 Artha – 2nd, 6th and 10th Bhavas/Houses – The need to acquire the necessary resources and abilities to provide for ourselves to fulfill our path and purpose.
 Kama – 3rd, 7th and 11th Bhavas/Houses – The need for desires and enjoyment.
 Moksha – 4th, 8th and 12th Bhavas/Houses – The need to find liberation and enlightenment from the world.

Theses 4 aims of life are repeated in above sequence 3 times through the 12 bhavas/houses:
 The first round, bhavas/houses 1 through 4, show the process within the Individual. 
 The second round, bhavas/houses 5 through 8, show the alchemy between relating to Other people. 
 The third round, bhavas/houses 9 through 12, show the Universalization of the self.

See also
 Nakshatras
 Panchangam
 Dasha
 Gandanta
 House (astrology)

References

Bibliography
 Hart deFouw and Robert Svoboda, Light on Life: An Introduction to the Astrology of India, Penguin, 1996
 Ronnie Gale Dreyer, Vedic Astrology: A Guide to the Fundamentals of Jyotish, Samuel Weiser, York Beach ME, 1997
 James T. Braha, Ancient Hindu Astrology for the Modern Western Astrologer, Hermetician Press, Hollywood FL, 1986
 David Pingree, Jyotiḥśāstra, Otto Harrassowitz, Wiesbaden, 1981

Hindu astronomy
Technical factors of Hindu astrology